Parental abuse or parent abuse can refer to:
 Parental abuse by children, maltreatment of a parent by their child or children
 Parental abuse of children, maltreatment or neglect of a child or children by a parent

See also
 Bullying